The League of Legends Circuit Oceania (LCO) is the top-level of professional League of Legends competition in Oceania, founded in 2021 and hosted by ESL Australia and Guinevere Capital. The LCO replaced the Oceanic Pro League (OPL), hosted by Riot Games Oceania from 2015 to 2020. The annual season consists of two splits, each of which conclude in a double-elimination tournament between the top five teams. 

Before 2023, the winner of split 1 qualifies for the Mid-Season Invitational (MSI), while the winner of split 2 qualifies for the League of Legends World Championship. However, since 2023, the top two teams from each LCO split will seed into the Pacific Championship Series (PCS) playoffs and compete with other PCS teams for a chance to represent the larger region at international events. LCO teams will be no longer qualifying directly to MSI and Worlds.

Format (2022)

Regular season 
 Eight teams participate.
 Double round-robin, best-of-one.
 Top five teams advance to playoffs.

Playoffs 
 Five teams participate
 Double elimination bracket.
 The 1st-place team from regular season receives a bye to begin in the second round of winners' bracket. 
 The 2nd and 3rd-place teams begin in the first round of the winners' bracket. 
 The 4th and 5h-place teams begin in the first round of the losers' bracket.

The winner of the each split will represent Oceania at the Mid-Season Invitational and World Championship respectively.

Broadcast Team

Teams

Result

Notes

References

External links 
 

League of Legends competitions